Vuka Popadić (née Jovanovic) was a Serbian heroine of the World War I. She saved a large number of people, especially women and children. She sheltered fifteen Austro-Hungarian soldiers, and later organized a bandage-station where she saved several hundred Serb soldiers.

Biography
When the war first reached Serbia, particularly the city of Belgrade, areas of today's Dorcol and Savamala neighborhoods were destroyed. In the days of the bombing, she was with her were her daughter Jelena and sister Jelena Lela Milutinovic, who was an actress of the National Theatre in Belgrade. Together with her sister, she refused to leave Belgrade. Regardless of the bombing, Popadić made a shelter at her home for people who were afraid. She forced the enemy to retreat. According to the tradition, Popadić went out of her apartment to see if there were any Austro-Hungarian soldiers in the area. When she found a group who were seeking shelter from the Serbian army, she told them in a strict voice to throw down their weapons and follow her to avoid getting killed. At her home, she provided her prisoners with slatko and water. After the Serbian army regained control of Belgrade, she turned the Austrian soldiers to the Serbian army. She was thanked by the Serbian army commander, and the Austro-Hungarian soldiers appreciated that their lives were saved. Popadić also opened a temporary repository for wounded Serb women where she was helped by her sister and daughter.

After the end of the war, she married Zivko Popadić, Treasurer of the Directorate of Tram and Lighting.

References

External links
 Вука Попадић, најхрабрија Београђанка у Великом рату (Vuka Popadic, the bravest Belgrader in the Great War) (Serbian language)

Serbian women in World War I
Year of birth unknown
Year of death unknown